Hong Beom-do (August 27, 1868 – October 25, 1943) was a Korean independence activist and general.

Biography 
Hong was born in Chasong, North Pyongan. During his early life, he was a hunter who lived in Korea during the Joseon Dynasty (1392-1910). In September 1907, Japan, as part of its colonial policies in Korea, passed a law that required hunters to turn in their hunting guns, with the intention of weakening the Korean resistance to the Japanese occupation. The law effectively crippled the ability of hunters to pursue their traditional livelihood, angering many hunters, including Hong.  In response to the outlawing of hunters' guns, Hong organized a resistance force named the 1907 Righteous Army of Jeongmi. The Righteous Army carried out a number of battles against Japanese garrisons around the Bukcheong area, using hit-and-run attacks.

When Japan annexed Korea in 1910, Hong moved to Manchuria, China to train anti-Japanese freedom fighters. In August 1919, Hong crossed the Tumen River with 400 soldiers. Once across the river and in Korea, Hong successfully attacked the Japanese troops in Hyesanjin, Jaseong, and Kapsan. Hong and his soldiers would cross the Tumen River twice more, each time carrying out successful attacks against the occupying Japanese forces.

In August 1919, Hong launched an advance operation into Korea. He succeeded in integrating the northern army in Gando with other forces. On May 28, 1920, Hong Beom-do's Korean Independence Army, Ahn-Mu's National Army and Choi Jin-dong's Military Affairs Command were combined into the Korean Northern Army Command. They assembled troops and were prepared for a significant military operation.

On June 4, 1920, troops of Korean Democratic Corps attacked Japanese Army units in Hamgyeongbuk-do Gangyang-dong. The next day, a Japanese unit pursued the Independence Army, and the Korean Northern Army Command trapped the Japanese in Samdunja, defeating hundreds of them.

Battle of Bongo-dong (Battle of Fengwudong) 
On June 6 and 7, as the conflict increased, the Japanese Army deployed a battalion from the 19th Division, stationing it at Nanam. The Japanese battalion launched an attack on Bongo-dong. The Independence Army combined forces were led by Hong Beom-do and hid in ambush in the mountains of Bongo-dong. As the Japanese forces advanced, the Korean militias ambushed the pursuing battalion from three sides, winning the battle. The Japanese battalion withdrew after suffering substantial casualties. An estimated 157 Japanese soldiers were killed and 300 wounded out of 500, and 13 Koreans were killed and 2 wounded out of 1,200~1,300.

The conflict became known as the Battle of Bongo-dong, or the Battle of Fengwudong. It was the first large-scale battle between the Korean Independence Army and the Japanese Army in Manchuria. The Korean soldiers and the leadership of the Korean Northern Army Command were inspired by the victory, as were Koreans in China and Korea. The Korean resistance forces served as momentum for further independence battles in the 1920s.

In October of the same year, working together with Kim Jwa-jin, Hong again carried out an attack against Japanese troops at what is known as the Battle of Cheongsanri.

The Japanese Army, having lost the battle in Cheongsang-ri and other locations, retaliated by carrying out a campaign of brutal scorched earth warfare that included the killing of Koreans and burning of villages. In response, the Korean Independence Army launched a military counter offensive. In December 1920, Hong's forces were integrated with other independence forces to organize the Korean Independence Corps.

Life in the Soviet Union 
In 1921, Hong and his forces sought refuge in the Soviet Union from the Japanese forces. In June, the Soviet military enacted a policy by Joseph Stalin to secure Russian borders near China and Korea. Concerned that the Japanese Army might enter the Soviet Union in pursuit of Hong and other Korean independence fighters, the Soviet Union disarmed Korean troops. But their refusal resulted in the Massacre of Svobodny where the Red Army massacred the Korean Partisans, and the loss of weapons and safe areas for Hong and his forces resulted in the collapse of the Korean Independence Army. Hong, still hoping to oppose the Japanese in Korea, chose to join the Red Army.

In 1937, Stalin's deportation of Koreans in the Soviet Union took place. Hong was among those 171,781 Koreans (almost the entire Soviet population of ethnic Koreans) forcibly relocated to Kazakhstan. Hong died in Kazakhstan in 1943.

On October 25, 1963, Hong was posthumously awarded the Republic of Korea Medal of Merit for National Foundation.

In August 2021, his remains were returned to Korea, ahead of an official state visit by Kazakh president Kassym-Jomart Tokayev to South Korea.

Korean independence army 
In 1919, Hong Beom-do (1868 ~ 1943) created relations with Koreans residing in Yeonggae, Primorsky Krai, and Gando (Jiandao). In March 1920, he joined forces with the Korean National Association Army, led by An Mu, and they became an autonomous organization of Korean resistance fighters opposed to Japanese colonialism. During this time they lived and operated in the area of Nosuando. Starting with the attack on Hyesanjin (a city located on the Yalu River) in August 1919, the military forces led by Hong launched a military campaign against the Japanese forces in northern Korea. After March 1920, Hong led the coalition of the Korean independence forces in the northern area of Manchuria.

Hong Beom-do, who had also led the Korean Righteous Army, has won several victories since 1907 at Gaksan, Samsu, and Bukcheong. These successes eventually led to increased attacks by the Japanese Army and the Korean army's activities in Korea became difficult, resulting in a need to escape in 1910 to Primorsky and Kando. Once in a safer location inside Russia, Hong continued his campaign against the Japanese. In August 1918, when Japan invaded Primorsky in support of the White Army during the Russian civil war, Hong Beom-do formed a military force centered around the former independence army and Korean people living in Manchuria. When the March 1st Movement took place in 1919, Hong and his soldiers moved to Antuhyun.

Later, in August 1919, the Korean independence army crossed the Yalu River and wiped out a Japanese military unit. This was the first domestic military operation to take place in Korea following the March 1st Movement. In October, Hong's forces once again moved into Korea, occupied Ganggye and Manpojin, fighting a fierce battle with the Japanese army in Jaseong county, northern Korea. By March 1920, Hong was allied with the Dongdo-dong Military Service, led by Choi Jin-dong, who had been stationed in Hoeryong and Jongseong (Wongseong) along the Tuman coast of the Tuman River. The domestic resistance operation of the Korean independence forces provided a boost to the national spirit of Koreans everywhere and prompted further armed resistance struggles in Manchuria.

By March 1920, the Korean independence army had moved its base from Antuhyun to Wang Qinghyun, China and received financial support from the Korean People's Association for a larger domestic resistance operation. Hong also joined forces with the National Liberation Army, which was under the leadership of the Korean People's Association. The military's finances and administration were managed by the Korean Minjok Association and the Korean Independence Army was directed by Hong Beom-do.

On May 3, 1920, the Korea Military Association held a joint military operation with other Korean military and resistance forces in Wangchunhyeon Poomdong. Also located there were the Provisional Ministry of Education, the Ministry of Military Affairs, and the Korean Civil Corps. The northern Korean military group orchestrated many of the subsequent activities, specifically being in charge of administration, politics, and finances. Hong Beom-do became the head of the Korean Northern Army Command and was in charge of the military forces. The Korean rebels were assembled into four groups under the leadership of Yi Cheon-oh, Kang Sang-mo, Kang Si-beom, and Jo Kwon-dong.

On June 4, 1920, the Independence Army of Korea, which was led by Park Seung-gil, entered Jaseong County, Korea and ambushed Samdungja and attacked a Japanese army patrol. In retaliation, the Japanese army occupied Nanam-dong (now Cheongjin) in North Hamgyeong-do of the Japanese 19th Division headquarter base. By June 7, the Daehan Independence Army, National Association Army, Doron Ministry of Military, and the Shinmin Corps had defeated the battalion of 19th Division of the Japanese Army in Bong-o-dong and won the great victory. On July 8, Hong and his forces surprised and defeated the Japanese police who were searching for the independence forces in that area.

See also 

 Korean independence movement
 Battle of Fengwudong
 Battle of Qingshanli
 Memorial Day

References

Further reading 
  한국민족문화대사전 (Ethnic Korean Culture Dictionary)
  Homepage of General Hong Beom-do

1868 births
1943 deaths
Korean generals
Korean independence activists
Korean expatriates in the Soviet Union
Koryo-saram
Namyang Hong clan
People granted political asylum in the Soviet Union